Nasrat Parsa (February 22, 1968 – May 8, 2005) was an Afghan singer. Up until his death, he continued his music in exile from Hamburg, Germany, occasionally touring other countries.

Personal life

Background
Nasrat Ali Parsa was born in a suburb of Kabul, Afghanistan. His family, especially his oldest brother Najibullah Parsa, was already involved in music to a certain extent and the environment of a musical household helped materialize Nasrat's artistic talents. According to Nasrat's personal account, he was first discovered after singing the songs of Ahmad Zahir on a national radio broadcast. After the singer heard the renditions of his songs by the 7 year old Nasrat, he got in touch with the child and invited him to sing with him. Thus was Nasrat's formal initiation into singing.

Emigration to India 
Due to Soviet occupation of Afghanistan and the ensuing disruptive guerrilla fighting, Nasrat Parsa and his family left Afghanistan in 1981 for Pakistan and subsequently to India. They took residence in the capital city of New Delhi, a popular destination for most war civilians. There, the 12-year-old Nasrat was said to delve into studying music to find comfort from the negative psychological effects of the war. He attended the school of music under the apprenticeship of classic Indian singer Daish Pandi. Although the classical music of Afghanistan and Indian classical music differ a bit in tone and rhythm, the training nonetheless gave Nasrat a foundation to prepare his voice and gave encouragement to the amateur to pursue his interest professionally. He also studied with Ustad Munawar Ali Khan, a leading authority in certain Indian music styles who taught him details of musical instruments and notes. It was these lessons that would prepare him for performing the ghazal that he later became known for in Europe.

Immigration to Germany
After a few transition years in India, Nasrat and his family immigrated to Germany. Establishing contact with other fellow countrymen in Hamburg, Nasrat became more involved in the music scene with the other exiled singers and musicians. There, he taught Waly Hedjasi, better known as VALY, a highly acclaimed musician.

From his initial involvements in private parties to the formal weddings where strong singing background is considered, Nasrat's name ranked high on the choice list. At this time, he started working on recording professional albums as well. His initial works met with moderate notability; however, they were commercially steady in success.

At weddings he was acclaimed for the warm welcoming of the bride and groom with his number Maa Destmal Aawordaim (ما دستمال آورديم ) (Gohar Album) which roughly translates as "we've brought our brother's bride." This album established Nasrat as a respected singer and also garnered him praise of critics. As a matter of fact, the monumentalizing of the bride and groom union following the entrance anthem of Ahesta Boro (آهسته برو) in weddings with the hit song of the Gohar Album is now a strong tradition of Afghan weddings.

His performances hereon became regular, and he often teamed with other singers to perform in various cities outside of Germany.

Death
On May 7, 2005, Nasrat Parsa performed a concert in Vancouver, Canada, on the occasion of Mother's Day, opening a comprehensive tour that was scheduled to include several cities in North America.

Following the concert, Nasrat was with his brother, Najib Parsa outside their hotel. They were approached by three young male fans, who asked for the singer's autograph and to take a picture with him. One of the men, 19 years old at the time, then punched Nasrat in the face. The punch caused Nasrat to lose his balance and he fell down onto four concrete stairs. The severity of his brain injuries resulted in his death the next day.

The man who punched him was found guilty of manslaughter and was given a conditional sentence of 2 years of house arrest and 3 years of probation.

Funeral 
On May 12, 2005, Nasrat Parsa's body was flown back to Germany for burial. The grief-stricken bereaved family members and fans around the world individually held services to honor the singer. Notably, the funeral held at Sayed Jamaladen Masjid by Habib Qaderi on May 15, 2005 in Orange County, United States, drew thousands of sorrowful fans. Other cities, in the United States, Canada, Europe, Australia, and Afghanistan also held similar mourning sessions. He was buried in Frankfurt, Germany in Mainzer Waldfriedhof.

Laguna Beach vigil 
On May 13, 2005, a candlelight vigil was held in memory of the singer in Laguna Beach, United States. The event, which drew many fans and sympathizers, called for a conscious effort to respect all singers from Afghanistan. Furthermore, it called for active action against violence in future concert events to protect the other musical assets of Afghanistan. The vigil was held with an Islamic theme to honor his family's religious tradition. Similar ceremonies were also held thereafter in various cities around the world in honor of the singer.

Discography 

Afghan Music
Sung in his native Persian
 درگاهDarga (Spring 1992)
 دنیاDonya (Winter 1995)
  گهرGohar (Summer 1996)
 سایهSaya (Summer 1997)
 نگاهNegah (Summer 1998)
 Live In Concert-Germany (Spring 2000)
 نازNaaz (January 2004)
 دلDil (Fall 2005, released posthumous)

INDIAN MUSIC
Sung in Hindi
 Hindi Songs (Spring 2002)

Videography 

 Hangama and Nasrat Parsa Live In Concert (2000)

Notable songs

References 

 Yahoo! News. Amy Carmichael. Afghani Pop Star, Nasrat Parsa, is Killed in Vancouver. May 9, 2005.
 CBC Arts. Visiting Afghan Singer Dead After Vancouver Attack.  May 10, 2005
 Vancouver Sun. Matthew Ramsey. Hundreds Mourn Afghan Singer. May 13, 2005
 BBC Report. Nasrat Parsa: A Tragic Loss in Afghan Music.  May 26, 2005
 CBCNews. Canada Now TV Report. Nasrat Parsa.''  May 2005

External links
 Nasrat Parsa's official website
 Listen to Nasrat Parsa albums and music online

1968 births
2005 deaths
People from Kabul
21st-century Afghan male singers
20th-century Afghan male singers
Afghan Tajik people
Afghan people murdered abroad
People murdered in British Columbia
2005 murders in Canada
2005 in British Columbia
Crime in British Columbia